Thanks for Risking Your Life  is a stand-up comedy film starring Lewis Black and directed by Benjamin Brewer. The set was recorded shortly before all live entertainments was halted due to the COVID-19 pandemic. The show was filmed on sovereign land at the Four Winds New Buffalo casino in New Buffalo Township, Michigan. The album version was nominated for the Grammy Award for Best Comedy Album but lost to Sincerely by Louis C.K.

Track listing 
 "Thanks for Risking Your Life" – 2:01
 "2 Day Free Shipping" – 9:07
 "Don’t Worry, Be Happy" – 5:33
 "An Important Lesson from Our Leader" – 2:49
 "Prevagen" – 5:40
 "The New Drug Dealers" – 4:09
 "My Parents" – 5:48
 "The Real Survivor" – 6:34
 "Chicken or the Egg" – 8:40
 "Our Leader" – 7:33
 "What’s Wrong with America" – 3:44

References

External links 

 
 
 Lewis Black official website

2020 films
American documentary films
2020 live albums
Stand-up comedy concert films
2020 comedy films
Spoken word albums by American artists
Live spoken word albums
2020s English-language films
2020s American films